The Galician League of Santiago de Compostela (Liga Gallega in both Spanish and Galician language) was a conservative and Galician regionalist political group founded in 1898 in Santiago de Compostela. The main figures of the League were Alfredo Brañas and Salvador Cabeza de León.

It was one of the currents in which the Galician Regionalist Association bifurcated. The Galician League of Santiago de Compostela was conservative, while the Galician League of A Coruña was ideologically liberal.

References

Beramendi, X.G. and Núñez Seixas, X.M. (1996): O nacionalismo galego. A Nosa Terra, Vigo
Beramendi, X.G. (2007): De provincia a nación. Historia do galeguismo político. Xerais, Vigo

1898 establishments in Spain
1900 disestablishments in Spain
Catholic political parties
Conservative parties in Spain
Defunct conservative parties
Defunct nationalist parties in Spain
Galician nationalist parties
Political parties in Galicia (Spain)
Political parties disestablished in 1900
Political parties established in 1898